Titan is a super-yacht built in 2010 at the shipyard Abeking & Rasmussen. The interior and exterior design of Titan was done by Reymond Langton Design Ltd. The yacht has three sister-ships, Amaryllis, C2 and Eminence, although Titan is a bit larger.

Not to be confused with the older motor yacht Titan, resulting from the conversion of HMS Beagle, a Royal Naval Coastal Survey Ship of the Bulldog Class.

Design 
The materials of the hull is Steel, with the superstructure made out of Aluminium. The yacht is Lloyd's registered, issued by Cayman Islands.

In March of 2022, Forbes reported that Titan was still owned by Alexander Abramov. Registered in Bermuda with a value of $82 million at 257 feet, on July 9th,  2022, the vessel was recorded off the coast of Bodrum, Turkey.

Engines 
The main engines are two Caterpillar Inc. 3516 DITA with a power of  each.

See also 
 Amaryllis
 C2
 Eminence
 Motor yacht
 List of motor yachts by length
 List of yachts built by Abeking & Rasmussen
 HMS Beagle (A319)

References

2010 ships
Motor yachts
Ships built in Germany